Jeral Davis (born September 17, 1984) is an American former professional basketball player. He played overseas for the majority of his professional career, most notably in Mexico, Japan, Venezuela, and the Dominican Republic. Previously he attended Talladega College.

References

External links
Talladega Tornadoes profile
Eurobasket.com profile
RealGM profile

External links
Jeral Davis Basketball Highlight 2k13-14 - Youtube.com video

1984 births
Living people
American expatriate basketball people in Japan
American expatriate basketball people in Mexico
American expatriate basketball people in Venezuela
American men's basketball players
Basketball players from Ohio
Centers (basketball)
Gaiteros del Zulia players
Power forwards (basketball)
Sendai 89ers players
Shimane Susanoo Magic players
Sportspeople from Toledo, Ohio
Talladega Tornadoes men's basketball players
Tijuana Zonkeys players